Henry Ezra Nichols (February 27, 1842 – June 10, 1899) was an officer in the United States Navy who served as the commander of the Department of Alaska from September 14, 1884, to September 15, 1884, as commander of the USS Pinta.

Nichols graduated from the US Naval Academy in September 1865, and served in the US Navy for the rest of his life, reaching the rank of captain in March 1899, a few months before his death.

Legacy

Nichols is the namesake for the specific epithet of the blackeye goby (Rhinogobiops nicholsii). He collected the specimen and captained the ship during the voyage.

Notes

1842 births
1899 deaths
United States Naval Academy alumni
Union Navy officers
United States Navy personnel of the Spanish–American War
Commanders of the Department of Alaska
Burials at Mountain View Cemetery (Oakland, California)